Hans Behrendt (28 September 1889 – 1942) was a German-Jewish actor, screenwriter and film director. He was murdered by the Nazis in Auschwitz concentration camp in 1942.

Selected filmography

Screenwriter
 Catherine the Great (1920)
 Christian Wahnschaffe (1920)
 The Island of the Lost (1921)
 The Poisoned Stream (1921)
 Fridericus Rex (1922)
 Fräulein Raffke (1923)
 The Most Beautiful Woman in the World (1924)
 Wood Love (1925)
 Athletes (1925)
 Curfew (1925)
 The Doll of Luna Park (1925)
 The Woman with That Certain Something (1925)
 Women You Rarely Greet (1925)
 The Mill at Sanssouci (1926)
 The Violet Eater (1926)
 Die Puppe vom Lunapark (1926)
 Our Daily Bread (1926)
 My Friend the Chauffeur (1926)
 Potsdam (1927)
 The Dancer of Sanssouci (1932)

Director
 Old Heidelberg (1923)
 The New Land (1924)
 Prinz Louis Ferdinand (1927)
 Potsdam (1927)
 The Trousers (1927)
 Dyckerpotts' Heirs (1928)
 Daughter of the Regiment (1929)
 The Smuggler's Bride of Mallorca (1929)
 The League of Three (1929)
 Kohlhiesel's Daughters (1930)
 Gloria (1931, French)
 Gloria (1931, German)
 The Office Manager (1931)
 Danton (1931)
 I Go Out and You Stay Here (1931)
 The Heath Is Green (1932)
 My Friend the Millionaire (1932)
 Wedding at Lake Wolfgang (1933)
 Must We Get Divorced? (1933)
 Doña Francisquita, Ibérica Films, SA. Barcelona (1934)
 Fräulein Lilli (1936)

Actor
 Mary Magdalene (1920)
 The Island of the Lost (1921)
 A Day on Mars (1921)
 Wood Love (1925)
 The Violet Eater (1926)

References

External links
 

Category:German male comedians

1889 births
1942 deaths
Writers from Berlin
Mass media people from Berlin
Male actors from Berlin
20th-century German male actors
German male writers
German male comedians
German people who died in Auschwitz concentration camp
German Jews who died in the Holocaust
Jewish German male actors
Jewish German writers
German male screenwriters
Jewish film people
Film directors from Berlin
20th-century German screenwriters